Sweet 20 is an  Indonesian musical romantic comedy film, a remake of the 2014 South Korean film Miss Granny, under collaboration of Starvision Plus in Indonesia and CJ Entertainment. This film is directed by Ody C. Harahap and stars Tatjana Saphira, Morgan Oey, Kevin Julio, Lukman Sardi, Niniek L. Karim and Slamet Rahardjo. This film tells the story about Fatmawati, a 70-year-old grandmother who magically gets back into her 20s after taking a photo in a mysterious photo studio. Sweet 20 was released on 25 June 2017 on the event of Eid al-Fitr.

Plot 

Fatmawati, a 70-year-old fussy grandmother, lives with her son, Aditya, daughter-in-law, and two grandchildren. Fatmawati has always been proud of Aditya, but is hurt when, one day, she finds out she will be sent to a nursing home. She runs away from the house, while regretting aging. That night, her sight falls upon mysterious photo studio Forever Young, and proceeds to want a picture of herself for her funeral. Before taking the photo, the photographer asks what she wants, she answers to make her look beautiful and young in the photo, then the photographer said he would make her 50 years younger. All is well, and the photo was taken, until suddenly Fatmawati really transforms into a woman 50 years younger; she becomes just like how she looked when she was 20 years old. Fatmawati started to live her new life as Mieke, a name of her idol Mieke Wijaya. As time goes by, Fatmawati gets the opportunity to realize her dream to become a singer, something she couldn't do back then. Her unique, old-fashioned speech and fashion style, conquers the heart of three men: music producer Alan, her own grandson, and Hamzah who has been in love with her 50 years ago. The latter has a late wife and living daughter, who constantly shows irritation at her father's caring attitude towards Fatmawati.

Throughout living as Mieke, Fatmawati is haunted by the fear that her legacy will be lost. Meanwhile, she learns that bleeding will cause her real skin to be exposed. As this is learned, Hamzah realizes the truth, and swears to keep this from everyone. As Fatmawati is about to appear on a television concert, everyone on the band learns that one of her grandson, Juna, loses a lot of blood in an accident. Juna's blood type is AB negative, one only belonged to Fatmawati. Unwilling to kill her grandson for her ego, she expresses will to transfer her blood to Juna. Aditya, who has known her identity all this time, apologizes to her mother for being a horrible son; Fatmawati says she never thinks so. While the band continues, Hamzah visits Young Forever just for Fatmawati, the love of his life.

Cast

Main Cast 
 Tatjana Saphira as young Fatmawati
 Saphira also portrays Mieke Wijaya
 Morgan Oey as Alan, a music producer
 Kevin Julio as Juna, Fatmawati's grandson

Supporting cast

Production 
The screenwriting was done by Upi. The film was shot in Bandung, including Braga Street, Asia Afrika Street and Bandung City Hall. Sweet 20 is an adaptation of the Korean film Miss Granny, with the difference is that Indonesian elements are added into the film, including dangdut and Lebaran. Miss Granny has been adapted into Chinese, Japanese, Thailand, and Vietnamese versions. Tatjana Saphira sang four of the five songs in the film, including "Bing" that was composed by Titiek Puspa, "Payung Fantasi" composed by Ismail Marzuki, "Layu Sebelum Berkembang" composed by A. Riyanto, and "Meraih Asa", the film's theme song, written by Upi and Tony with arrangement by Bemby Gusti. Besides those four songs, Gugun Blues Shelter sang "Selayang Pandang" composed by Lili Suhairi.

Release 
The film was released on 25 June 2017 on the event of Eid al-Fitr, together with Jailangkung, Surat Kecil untuk Tuhan, and Insya Allah Sah.

Reception 
As of 15 July 2017, Sweet 20 has been watched by 1,001,935 people.

According to film observer Shandy Gasella, "this remake is not as sitcom as the original film by Hwang Dong-Hyuk. The tone of the film is soft and happier, I like the grading. There are many additions of scenes of laughter, making this movie feel 'the same but different'." However, this film does not improvise much from the original film, and even though Fatma admires Mieke Wijaya, young Fatma's makeup is unlike Wijaya's. According to Jodhi Yudono from Kompas, Sweet 20 managed to be a family drama film as well as romantic comedy that is thick with the colours of Indonesia, both in settings, such as putting the atmosphere of Lebaran and conflict between children- and parents-in-law, and jokes throughout the film. This film also mixes senior film stars with recent actors, creating a nostalgic nuance.

Awards

References

External links 

2017 films
2010s Indonesian-language films
2017 romantic comedy films
Indonesian romantic comedy films
Remakes of South Korean films
CJ Entertainment films